The Conjuror's Bird is a 2005 novel by British author Martin Davies which fictionalises the early life of botanist Joseph Banks and the search to find the Mysterious Bird of Ulieta. It was selected for the Richard & Judy Book of the Year in 2006.

2005 British novels
British historical novels
Novels set in Oceania
Novels set on islands
Novels set in the 18th century
French Polynesia in fiction
Hodder & Stoughton books